The Westsylvania Heritage Corporation (formerly the Allegheny Heritage Development Corporation) is a public organization centered in Hollidaysburg, Pennsylvania. It was created in the late 1990s by the Southwestern Pennsylvania Heritage Preservation Commission, a federal commission made to oversee the America's Industrial Heritage Project. Westsylvania's aims are to promote the history and protect the identity of western Pennsylvania; among its actions toward these ends was the publication of Westsylvania magazine, a quarterly periodical on the history of and life in the region, which was issued from 1997 through 2006, when it ceased publication for lack of funding.

See also
Westsylvania

External links

Heritage organizations
Pennsylvania culture